Abriendo Puertas is a 1995 album released by Gloria Estefan. It is her sixth studio album as a soloist and second Spanish language album released.

Content
Abriendo Puertas was the second Spanish language studio album released by Estefan after her successful Spanish debut album, Mi Tierra.

In contrast to Mi Tierra, an album primarily influenced by Cuban music, Abriendo Puertas draws on a wider variety of Latin American musical styles. For instance, the title track is an example of vallenato, a Colombian music genre.  Several of the songs refer to Christmas and the New Year. The album has sold 2.3 million copies outside the US.

Estefan's second Spanish album won Best Tropical/Salsa Album at the 1996 Grammy Awards, her second Grammy Award.

Track listing

Personnel
Adapted from AllMusic.

 Donna Allen – guest artist, background vocals
 Marcelo Añez – assistant engineer
 Randy Barlow – trumpet
 Edwin Bonilla – percussion
 Stony Browder – arranger
 Cachao, Frank Cornelius – bass guitar
 Charles Calello – arranger
 Ed Calle – guest artist, tenor saxophone
 Scott Canto – assistant engineer
 Jorge Casas – arranger, bass guitar, mandocello, programming
 Sean Chambers – assistant engineer
 Charles Christopher, Rick Krive, Rita Quintero, Joy Francis, LaGaylia Frazier – background vocals
 Mike Couzzi – engineer
 Paquito D'Rivera – clarinet
 Lawrence Dermer – arranger, fender rhodes, piano, programming, tambourine, background vocals
 Nancy Donald – art direction
 Emilio Estefan Jr. –  producer
 Gloria Estefan – primary artist, background vocals
 Hector Garrido – conductor, orchestration
 Andy Goldman – guitar
 Berry Gordy Jr.
 Mark Gruber – assistant engineer
 Jim Hacker – trumpet
 Lauren Hammock – French horn
 Diana Serna - background vocals
 Al Kooper – arranger
 Sebastián Krys – assistant engineer
 Patrice Levinson – engineer
 Andrew Lewinter – French horn
 Gary Lindsay, Whit Sidener – alto saxophone
 Fred Lipsius – arranger
 Bob Ludwig – mastering
Gonzalo "El Cocha" Molina- accordion
 Juan R. Marquez, Andy Goldman, Tim Mitchell – guitar
 Teddy Mulet, Dana Teboe – trombone
 Clay Ostwald – arranger, Hammond organ, piano, programming
 Scott Perry – engineer
 Steve Robillard – assistant engineer
 Steve Rucker – drums
 Eric Schilling – engineer, mixing
 Nathaniel Seidman – arranger, programming
 Cindy Sluka – English horn, oboe
 Ted Stein – engineer
 Ron Taylor – engineer
 Alberto Tolot – photography
 Nestor Torres – flute
 Yvonne Yedibalian – assistant engineer

Charts

Weekly charts

Certifications

Awards

Release history

See also
1995 in Latin music
List of number-one Billboard Tropical Albums from the 1990s
List of best-selling Latin albums

References

1995 albums
Gloria Estefan albums
Albums produced by Emilio Estefan
Grammy Award for Best Tropical Latin Album